Furia Musical was a Mexican music magazine published by Editorial Televisa, which includes articles and gossip about the famous singers in this genre.

History and profile
Furia Musical was launched in Mexico City in September 1993.

The magazine had Mexico and United States editions as well as an awards show ("Premios Furia Musical") that is broadcast by Televisa, Galavisión and Univision. The US edition was published on a biweekly basis and was based in Miami, Florida. The magazine ceased publication in the U.S. with its December 2006 issue.

References

External links
 (es) '''Premios Furia Musical.

Magazines established in 1993
Magazines published in Mexico
Music magazines
Spanish-language magazines
Mass media in Mexico City
1993 establishments in Mexico
Biweekly magazines
Magazines published in Florida
Magazines disestablished in 2006